Gideon Brecher (12 January 1797 – 14 May 1873), also known by the pen name Gedaliah ben Eliezer (was an Austrian writer and physician. He was a central figure in the Moravian Haskalah.

Biography
Brecher was born in Prossnitz, Moravia, and attended yeshivot in Eibenschütz and Nikolsburg. He was the first Jew of Prossnitz to study medicine or any other professional field. Brecher received a graduate degree in surgery and obstetrics at the University of Pest in 1824, and obtained a doctorate in medicine at the University of Erlangen in 1849, with the thesis Das Transcendentale, Magie und Magische Heilarten im Talmud (Vienna, 1850).

Brecher's fame in Jewish literature rests principally on this work and upon his lucid commentary on the Kuzari of Judah ha-Levi, which appeared with the text in four parts (Prague, 1838–1840). His correspondence with Samuel David Luzzato about this commentary was also published.

In addition to many contributions to scientific and literary periodicals and collections, and some important "Gutachten" (expert opinions) on social and religious questions submitted to him by imperial and local government officials, Brecher is the author of a monograph on circumcision, Die Beschneidung der Israeliten (Vienna, 1845), with an introduction by Hirsch Fassel, and an appendix on Circumcision Among the Semitic Nations, by Moritz Steinschneider.

Partial bibliography

References
 

1797 births
1873 deaths
19th-century Austrian Jews
19th-century Austrian physicians
Austrian obstetricians
Czech Jews
Czech medical writers
Eötvös Loránd University alumni
People of the Haskalah
Moravian Jews
Moravian writers
People from the Margraviate of Moravia
University of Erlangen-Nuremberg alumni
Writers from Prostějov